Changxing Island (Chinese: t , s , p Chángxīng Dǎo,  "Long-Happy Island") may refer to:

 Changxing Island, Shanghai, in the Yangtze River estuary
 Changxing Island, Dalian

See also
 Changxing (disambiguation)